The 2010 Barcelona Open Banco Sabadell (also known as the Torneo Godó) was a tennis tournament played on outdoor clay courts. It was the 58th edition of the event known this year as the Barcelona Open Banco Sabadell, and was part of the ATP World Tour 500 series of the 2010 ATP World Tour. It took place at the Real Club de Tenis Barcelona in Barcelona, Catalonia, Spain, from April 19 through April 25, 2010.

Defending champion Rafael Nadal withdrew from the tournament this year citing fatigue.

The event also featured a seniors' tournament that was part of the ATP Champions Tour, which was held from April 16 to 18. Goran Ivanišević won the title.

Finals

Singles

 Fernando Verdasco defeated  Robin Söderling, 6–3, 4–6, 6–3
 It was Verdasco's 2nd title of the year and 5th of his career. It was the 8th straight year a Spaniard had won the title.

Doubles

 Daniel Nestor /  Nenad Zimonjić defeated  Lleyton Hewitt /  Mark Knowles, 4–6, 6–3, [10-5]

Seniors

 Goran Ivanišević defeated  Thomas Enqvist, 6–4, 6–4

Entrants

Seeds

 Rankings as of April 12, 2010.

Other entrants
The following players received wildcards into the main draw:
  Marcel Granollers
  Filip Krajinović
  Alberto Martín
  David Nalbandian
  Fernando Verdasco

The following players received entry from the qualifying draw:
  Simone Bolelli
  Pablo Cuevas
  Daniel Gimeno-Traver
  Marsel İlhan
  Albert Ramos-Viñolas
  Pere Riba
  Christophe Rochus

The following players received the lucky loser spot:
  Teymuraz Gabashvili
  Nicolás Lapentti
  Iván Navarro

Notable withdrawals
The following players withdrew from the tournament for various reasons:
 Rafael Nadal (fatigue)
 Nikolay Davydenko (wrist injury)
 Philipp Kohlschreiber (abductor)
 Juan Martín del Potro (wrist injury)
 Radek Štěpánek
 Gilles Simon (right knee)
 Tomáš Berdych (left ankle)
 David Nalbandian (right leg)

External links 

 

 
Barcelona Open Banco Sabadell
2010 in Catalan sport
Barcelona